Ink, or Ink Global, is a travel media publishing and technology company founded in 1994. Based in London, Ink publishes 33 inflight magazines for 24 airlines worldwide.

History
Ink was founded in London, in 1994, by Simon Leslie and Michael Keating to service two airlines in the Middle East and Africa. Initially based in Shoreditch, London, the company's headquarters moved to West Hampstead. As of 2019, Ink employs approximately 300 people globally.

Business 
In a 2019 article Ink was described as “the publisher bucking the print trend”.

Magazines

Video
In 2019, Ink took a controlling share in ReachTV in Los Angeles.

Targeted Advertising platform

Advertising

References

Magazine publishing companies of the United Kingdom
Marketing companies of the United Kingdom
Local mass media in London
Media and communications in the London Borough of Camden